Three Flights from Alto Nido is the third studio album by San Diego, California-based singer-songwriter Greg Laswell. It was released through Vanguard Records on July 8, 2008. The song "Comes and Goes (In Waves)" was featured in the promotional trailer and soundtrack for the HBO film Taking Chance in early 2009, as well as an episode of True Blood in October 2008. "How the Day Sounds" featured in an episode of 90210, "Sweet Dream" featured in an episode of Dollhouse and "And Then You" featured in an episode of Grey's Anatomy in September 2008.

Track listing
All songs written by Greg Laswell.

 "That It Moves" – 3:54
 "The One I Love" – 2:35
 "It's Been a Year" – 3:12
 "Comes and Goes (In Waves)" – 4:13
 "How the Day Sounds" – 4:49
 "Sweet Dream" – 1:07
 "Days Go On" – 3:15
 "I'd Be Lying" – 4:45
 "Farewell" – 3:56
 "And Then You" – 3:29
 "Not Out" – 3:32

Bonus track
 "That It Moves" (GarageBand Demo) – 3:18

Credits
 All songs written, recorded, and performed by Greg Laswell
 Recorded at Dog's Bark Studio in Santa Ana, California, except "How the Day Sounds" and "Days Go On" recorded in Greg's studio in San Diego
 Greg Laswell – vocals, piano, acoustic guitar, electric guitar, harmonium, bass, melotron, bells, and organ
 Brandon Walters – acoustic guitars, electric guitars, banjo
 Molly Jenson – vocals on "Comes and Goes (In Waves)" and "Farewell"
 Alec Little – upright bass (on "The One I Love"), electric bass (on "That It Moves," "Comes and Goes (In Waves)," and "I'd Be Lying")

References

Greg Laswell albums
2008 albums
Vanguard Records albums